The Turkic Sanctuaries of Merke are located in southern Kazakhstan, roughly 37 km south of present-day Merke in the Jambyl Province.  At 3000 m high, the sanctuaries in this mountainous region of Kirghizki Alatau number more than 170 over nearly 250 km2.  The sites are well-preserved at the moment due to their isolation and relative difficulty of access. Each site may include small stelae (one to four), possibly representing the ancestors buried underneath.

World Heritage Status 
This site was added to the UNESCO World Heritage Tentative List on September 24, 1998 in the Mixed (Cultural & Natural) category.

See also 
 List of World Heritage Sites in Kazakhstan

References 

Kazakhstani culture
Archaeological sites in Kazakhstan
World Heritage Tentative List